Agafonovskaya is a rural locality (a village) in Kemskoye Rural Settlement, Vytegorsky District, Vologda Oblast, Russia. The population was 22 as of 2002.

Geography 
Agafonovskaya is located 100 km southeast of Vytegra (the district's administrative centre) by road. Pankratovo is the nearest rural locality.

References 

Rural localities in Vytegorsky District